Warren is a town in the Orana Region of New South Wales, Australia. It is located off the Mitchell Highway, 120 kilometres north west of Dubbo, and is the seat of the Warren Shire local government area.
Warren is included in the Central West Slopes and Plains division of the Bureau of Meteorology forecasts.

History 
Before European settlement the area is said to have been occupied by the Ngiyambaa Aborigines. Explorer John Oxley camped on the present town site during his investigation of the Macquarie River in 1818. He noted an abundance of kangaroos and emus. Charles Sturt carried out further exploration in 1828-29. Cattle were grazing hereabouts by the late 1830s.

Warren station was established in 1845 by Thomas Readford and William Lawson, the son of explorer William Lawson who was a member of the first European party to breach the Blue Mountains in 1813. Some say the name derives from a local Aboriginal word, meaning "strong" or "substantial". Another theory is that it represents the adoption of a contemporary English term, "warren", meaning a game park - perhaps a reference to the picturesque riverside setting where the station hut was built (on what is now Macquarie Park) and to the large numbers of wildlife in the area.

A small police station was built near the hut to protect the new settlers from Aborigines but there being no disturbances the police soon moved on. The hut was located by the site of a river-crossing on the main route from Dubbo. Stockmen camped here in the bend by the river, adjacent to the Warren Hole (a natural and permanent waterhole), before crossing over on the gravel bar when the water was sufficiently low. A few stayed on and a site for a township was consequently surveyed in 1860 with land sales proceeding in 1861.

A post office opened in 1861, a bootmaker's shop (made of bark) in 1863, a store in 1866, a school in 1867, an Anglican church in 1873, the first courthouse in 1874 and the first bridge in 1875. However, the closer settlement did not really develop until the late 1880s.

Warren was incorporated as a municipality in 1895 and the Warren Weir was established in 1896. The town benefited greatly with the arrival of the railway in 1898, making it the railhead for an enormous area. In general terms, its prosperity rose and fell with the price of wool. In the 1920s the town developed quite substantially. In the Great Depression the economy shrank, expanding again in the postwar years. The eternal water shortage was greatly eased when Burrendong Dam was opened in 1967, allowing the development of cotton and produce.

Economy 
Warren is one of the main centres for the wool and cotton growing industries in New South Wales. It is a well-known area for merino breeding with local studs that include Haddon Rig, Raby and Egelabra.

Warren is the startup location of Commodity Broking Services (CBS), whose purpose is to aid and educate Australian farmers suffering from drought with some financial stability in commodity trading and product protection.  CBS's agricultural division is still located in Warren.

Population
According to the 2016 census of Population, there were 1,530 people in Warren.
 Aboriginal and Torres Strait Islander people made up 20.4% of the population. 
 81.3% of people were born in Australia and 86.3% of people spoke only English at home
 The most common responses for religion were Catholic 32.5%, Anglican 28.6% and No Religion 13.1%.

Geography 
The Macquarie River runs through Warren.

Climate 
Warren experiences a humid subtropical climate (Köppen: Cfa, Trewartha: Cfak), with hot summers and cool winters.

Media 
Warren is serviced by a weekly local newspaper, The Warren Weekly. 
Online, there is a local website for business listings and local updates at http://www.warrennsw.com
On Facebook, look for the page 'WarrenNSW2824' for regular local updates.

Sport and recreation 
Warren Pumas Rugby Club play in the Western Plains competition. The Warren Bulldogs are a member of the Castlereagh Cup rugby league competition but are currently in recess.

Warren's racecourse is home to the Warren Jockey Club, which holds four major race meetings each year.

The Far West Academy of Sport is based in Warren and is responsible for identifying talented young sportspeople across 42% of the state.

Warren Gun Club has been running since 1898 and continues to hold a number of feature events throughout the year, attracting sporting shooters from around New South Wales.

Notable people from Warren
 Warren Bardsley, former Australian test cricket captain 
 Sharan Burrow, former president of the Australian Education Union, and former president of the ACTU.
 Ben McCalman, former Wallabies No.8 and Western Force player
 Greg Storer, country music singer

References

External links

SMH - Warren
Warren Shire
Warren Historical and Family History

Towns in New South Wales
Warren Shire